Ware Neck Store and Post Office, also known as Nuttall's Country Store, is a United States historic commercial building located at Ware Neck, Gloucester County, Virginia.  It was built in 1877 and expanded in the early 20th century.  The building consists of a two-story, three bay, frame central block flanked by 1 1/2-story wings. The central block sits under a front gabled roof while the flanking wings have side gabled roofs.

It was added to the National Register of Historic Places in 2009.

References

External links
Nuttall General Store website

Commercial buildings on the National Register of Historic Places in Virginia
Commercial buildings completed in 1877
Buildings and structures in Gloucester County, Virginia
National Register of Historic Places in Gloucester County, Virginia
1877 establishments in Virginia